The first and inaugural season of the Canadian competitive reality television series MasterChef Canada, featuring Michael Bonacini, Alvin Leung and Claudio Aprile premiered on CTV on January 20, 2014, and concluded on April 28 with Chinese-Canadian chemical engineering university student Eric Chong named the winner. Filming commenced in September 2013 and wrapped up in November 2013. At the age of 21, Eric was the youngest winner of MasterChef Canada at the time of his victory, a record he held the record until Beccy Stables became the champion of the show's fifth season at age 19.

After his victory, Chong partnered up with Chef Alvin Leung to open up Rebel and Demon "R&D" Restaurant located in Spadina, Toronto, specializing in East Asian cuisine; the restaurant was promotionally featured in a restaurant takeover in the third season. Chong also guest starred in an episode of the second season and the fifth season, and appeared in the show's MasterChef Canada: All-Star Family Edition 2016 holiday special, where his team was the first one eliminated.

Contestant Dora Cote, who originally came in 11th Place later returned to MasterChef Canada: Back to Win. She came in 12th Place.

Top 16

Elimination table

 (WINNER) This cook won the competition.
 (RUNNER-UP) This cook finished in second place.
 (WIN) The cook won the individual challenge (Mystery Box Challenge or Elimination Test).
 (WIN) The cook was on the winning team in the Team Challenge and was directly advanced to the next round.
 (HIGH) The cook was one of the top entries in the individual challenge, but did not win, or received considerable praise during an Elimination Challenge.
 (PT) The cook was on the losing team in the Team Challenge, but won the Pressure Test.
 (IN) The cook was not selected as a top entry or bottom entry in an individual challenge.
 (DNP) The chef was injured or sick and couldn´t participate in the challenge.
 (IN) The cook was not selected as a top entry or bottom entry in a team challenge.
 (IMM) The cook did not have to compete in that round of the competition and was safe from elimination.
 (IMM) The cook was selected by Mystery Box Challenge winner and did not have to compete in the Elimination Test. 
 (PT) The cook was on the losing team in the Team Challenge, competed in the Pressure Test, and advanced.
 (NPT) The cook was on the losing team in the Team Challenge, but was exempted from the Pressure Test.
 (LOW) The cook was one of the bottom entries in an individual elimination challenge or Pressure Test and they advanced.
 (LOW) The cook was one of the bottom entries in a team challenge and they advanced.
 (ELIM) The cook was eliminated from MasterChef.

Episodes

References

MasterChef Canada
2014 Canadian television seasons